Campina do Monte Alegre is a municipality in the state of São Paulo in Brazil. The population is 6,057 (2020 est.) in an area of 185 km². The elevation is 612 m, 2090 ft.

References

Municipalities in São Paulo (state)